Eman Elassi (born 28 August 1985) is an Egyptian actress.

Biography
Elassi was born in Cairo. She studied business administration before becoming an actress.

Her acting career began after the director Khaled Bahgat saw a photo of her in a magazine. He contacted her and offered her a role in a television series called Ams La Ymout (Yesterday Does Not Die). She performed alongside Raghda and Riadh al-Khouli as Raghda's daughter. Her next role was in the series Ahlam fi al-Bowaba (Dreams in the Gate), directed by Haitham Hakki. Since then, she has acted extensively in television and film.

Filmography

Television roles
 Haq Mashrou
 El sabaa banat
 Ragoul wa Imra'ataan
 Adeyet Nasab
 Ahlam fel Bawaba
 Dawet Farah
 Hadret El Motaham Aby
 Hob La yamot
 Sabaa Banat
 Al Adham
 Ela Ana
 Eldayra
 Naseeby We Esmetak

Film roles
 Masgoun Tranzeet
 Ma'lab Harameyya
 Hikayat Bint (Girl’s Story)
 Hamati Bethebini
 Faris

References

1985 births
Living people
Egyptian film actresses
Actresses from Cairo
Egyptian television actresses
21st-century Egyptian actresses